Hachatur Stepanyan (born ) is a former Russian male volleyball player. He was part of the Russia men's national volleyball team. On club level he played for Belogorie Belgorod.

References

External links
 profile at FIVB.org

1985 births
Living people
Russian men's volleyball players
Place of birth missing (living people)